is a city located in Saitama Prefecture, Japan. , the city had an estimated population of 75,697 in 39,563 households and a population density of 15,000 persons per km². Warabi has the smallest area of any municipality in Japan, and highest population density outside of the special wards of Tokyo.

Geography
Warabi is located southeastern part of Saitama Prefecture, bordering Saitama City in the north, Toda in the west, and Kawaguchi in the east. The city area is in the Arakawa lowland and averages 4.8 meters above sea level. Land use mainly consists of residential areas.

Surrounding municipalities
 Saitama Prefecture
 Kawaguchi
 Toda
 Saitama

Climate
Warabi has a humid subtropical climate (Köppen Cfa) characterized by warm summers and cool winters with light to no snowfall.  The average annual temperature in Warabi is 14.8 °C. The average annual rainfall is 1482 mm with September as the wettest month. The temperatures are highest on average in August, at around 26.6 °C, and lowest in January, at around 3.2 °C.

Demographics
Per Japanese census data, the population of Warabi has remained relatively constant over the past 50 years.

History
Warabi developed from the Muromachi period as Warabi-shuku, a post town on the Nakasendō highway. It was created as a town with the establishment of the modern municipalities system on 1 April 1889 and was elevated to city status on 1 April 1959.

Government
Warabi has a mayor-council form of government with a directly elected mayor and a unicameral city council of 18 members. Warabi contributes one member to the Saitama Prefectural Assembly. In terms of national politics, the city is part of Saitama 15th district of the lower house of the Diet of Japan. The directly-elected executive mayor is Hideo Yoritaka, a member of the Japanese Communist Party.

Elections 
 2007 Warabi mayoral election
 2007 Warabi city assembly election

Economy
Warabi has many small and medium-sized factories, which have employed many foreign workers. In particular, many Iranians and Kurds fled the ethnic problems and wars in the Middle East, and have settled in Warabi. Recently, the ratio of Chinese residents is the highest in Saitama Prefecture. The bulk of the working population commutes to Saitama City or Tokyo Metropolis, making Warabi largely a commuter town.

Education
Warabi has seven public elementary schools and three public middle schools operated by the city government, and one public high school operated by the Saitama Prefectural Board of Education. There is also one combined private middle/high school.

High schools
 Saitama Prefectural Warabi High School
 Bunan High School

Middle schools
 Warabi Municipal No. 1 Junior High School
 Warabi Municipal No. 2 Junior High School
 Warabi Municipal Higashi Junior High School

Elementary schools
 Warabi Municipal Chūō Elementary School
 Warabi Municipal Chūō-Higashi Elementary School
 Warabi Municipal Nishi Elementary School
 Warabi Municipal Higashi Elementary School
 Warabi Municipal Tsukagoshi Elementary School
 Warabi Municipal Kita Elementary School
 Warabi Municipal Minami Elementary School

Transportation

Railway
 JR East – Keihin-Tohoku line

Highway

Sister city relations
 El Dorado County, California, USA is a sister municipality to Warabi city in 26 March 1975.

Noted people from Warabi
Hidetaka Yoshioka, actor
Yasuhiro Suzuki, professional wrestler 
Yana Toboso, manga artist
Haruna Kojima, actress and model, former member of AKB48
Gen Hoshino, singer-songwriter

References

External links

Official Website 

 
Cities in Saitama Prefecture